Yermakovka is a rural locality (a selo) in Lebedinsky Selsoviet, Tabunsky District, Altai Krai, Russia. The population was 32 as of 2013. There is 1 street.

Geography 
Yermakovka is located 24 km east of Tabuny (the district's administrative centre) by road. Saratovka is the nearest rural locality.

References 

Rural localities in Tabunsky District